Rolling Rock is a 4.4% abv American lager launched in 1939 by the Latrobe Brewing Company. Although founded as a local beer in Western Pennsylvania, it was marketed aggressively and eventually became a national product. The brand was sold to Anheuser-Busch of St. Louis, Missouri, in mid-2006, which transferred brewing operations to New Jersey while continuing to label the new beer prominently with the name of Latrobe.

History
From 1939 until July 26, 2006, Rolling Rock was brewed at the Latrobe Brewing Company in Latrobe, Pennsylvania, a small city 34 miles southeast of Pittsburgh, Pennsylvania. As stated on the bottle, it was brewed with a distinctive soft local water in large glass-lined tanks, which were considered state-of-the-art at the time of its introduction (in part due to sanitation concerns).

On May 19, 2006, Anheuser-Busch purchased the Rolling Rock and Rolling Rock Green Light brands from InBev for $82 million and began brewing Rolling Rock at its Newark facility in mid July, 2006. The final batch of Rolling Rock was shipped from Latrobe on July 31, 2006. Union leaders in Westmoreland County organized a nationwide boycott of Anheuser-Busch and InBev brands because of the move. Anheuser-Busch has said that Rolling Rock's original pledge on the label will be preceded by these words: "To honor the tradition of this great brand, we quote from the original pledge of quality." In July 2008, InBev reached a deal to acquire Anheuser-Busch, thereby returning ownership of Rolling Rock to InBev, now known as Anheuser–Busch InBev and based in Belgium.

In 2009, Anheuser-Busch InBev announced that it was exploring the sale of the Rolling Rock brand. In 2015, Anheuser-Busch stopped brewing bottled Rolling Rock in glass-lined tanks. Only the canned beer was now being brewed using the traditional process.

Pony bottle
Rolling Rock's  pony bottle had been very popular until its discontinuation, so much so that this had given rise to the folk etymology that "pony" is from the Rolling Rock horse logo. This is incorrect: the term pony in "pony of beer" has been used in the United States of America since the 19th century, predating Rolling Rock by over 50 years, and is due to the diminutive size; similar words include pony glass and pony keg. Indeed, advertising for Rolling Rock since the 1950s uses the term "pony bottle" generically, stating "... Rolling Rock is the Largest Selling 7 oz. Pony Bottle of Premium Beer in Pennsylvania".

Though it did not originate the term, the popularity of Rolling Rock doubtless reinforced it: one could refer to a regular (12 oz.) or small (7 oz.) of the beer as a "horse" or "pony" respectively. It also likely led to the standardization on a 7 oz. size: major national brands introduced 7 oz. pony bottles in the early 1970s, of which the most prominent is Miller High Life (pony introduced 1972).

Number 33

The number 33 is printed prominently on all bottles of Rolling Rock. Many have speculated on the significance of the number 33:  that the "33" refers to 1933, the founding year of the Pittsburgh Steelers (who hold their annual training camp at Saint Vincent College in Latrobe, PA); that 33 degrees Fahrenheit is the proper temperature to keep beer; the 33 degrees of Scottish Rite Freemasonry; that Latrobe test-brewed 33 batches of beer before coming up with the final formula for Rolling Rock. Other theories concerning the number 33 are that there were exactly 33 stairsteps from the brewmaster's office to the brewing floor in the original Latrobe brewery.  Also that the Pennsylvania fish and game commission at the turn of the century numbered the streams within the commonwealth and the water that was used to brew this beer was taken from the stream numbered 33.

The words "Rolling Rock" appear three times on the bottle for a total of 33 letters.

One widely held belief is that it marks the repeal of prohibition in 1933.

James L. Tito, former CEO of Latrobe Brewing, opined that the "33" signifies the 33 words in the beer's original pledge of quality, which is still printed on every bottle:

While the original wording on the label was somewhat different, it also contained the 33 following words:

This was followed by the "33". The current pledge is on the 12 oz. bottles, while the "little nip" pledge is from the 7 oz. bottle version.  The 7 oz. bottles were referred in some parts of Pennsylvania as “nippers”, and a popular mode of packaging was in cases of 24, with a perforation so the case could be split in two, or a dozen each. 

A founding executive is said to have written "33" at the end of the slogan to indicate the number of words it comprised as a guide for the bottle printers. They assumed it was part of the text and incorporated it into the label graphics. Hence, the first batch of bottles carried the number "33" and they remained that way since they were continually collected and reused.

Tito admitted, however, that there is no hard proof for this theory, and that at this point no one really knows what the true origin of the "33" may have been.  Nonetheless, the tradition of the printing explanation has been sustained by the company as the wording on the labels has changed over the years, and the verbiage is carefully structured to retain a length of 33 words. The Rolling Rock nomenclature on the bottles was painted on, not paper or plastic.

Rolling Rock Red

Anheuser-Busch introduced a red lager version of Rolling Rock called Rolling Rock Red. While the number 33 has been a traditional part of Rolling Rock iconography, Rolling Rock Red's label has a "3", presumably signifying the name of the beverage ("Rolling Rock Red") or the words in the tagline "Finely Crafted Lager", which appears only on the Rolling Rock Red bottles.

In media
Rolling Rock is a significant symbol in internet celebrity James Rolfe's series Angry Video Game Nerd, where his character, the Nerd, takes a sip from a bottle of the drink to calm himself down when getting angry at bad games. Rolling Rock also appeared occasionally on episodes of The Sopranos, which was based in New Jersey.

In the 1978 film The Deer Hunter, Robert De Niro’s character (Michael) offers Meryl Streep's character (Linda) a Rolling Rock.

Rolling Rock is prominently featured in the 1986 film At Close Range, which takes place in rural Pennsylvania.

Red Forman is occasionally shown drinking Rolling Rock during dinner scenes in That 70's Show.

Rolling Rock is also featured in the movie That’s My Boy, which has the father of the main character double fisting bottles of the ‘rock

Rolling Rock is featured in the series Mare of Easttown, as a favorite beer of main character.

See also

 Iron City Brewing Company
 Rolling Rock Club
 Rolling Rock Town Fair

References

External links
Rolling Rock official website

American beer brands
Anheuser-Busch beer brands
Westmoreland County, Pennsylvania
Products introduced in 1939
Latrobe, Pennsylvania